Paul Robert Rust (born April 12, 1981) is an American actor, comedian and writer. He starred in the 2009 film I Love You, Beth Cooper and in the Netflix series Love.

Early life
Rust was born in Le Mars, Iowa, the son of Jeanne and Bob Rust. His family is of German heritage. Rust was raised Roman Catholic and attended Gehlen Catholic High School. His mother was a teacher at Le Mars Community High School and his father owned a Western goods and boot-repair shop. He graduated from the University of Iowa in May 2004.

Rust struggled with obsessive-compulsive disorder in his youth.

Career
Rust is best known as a stand-up and sketch comedian at the Upright Citizens Brigade Theater in Los Angeles, where he is a member of the sketch comedy group A Kiss from Daddy and the improv team Last Day of School. He has appeared in films such as Inglourious Basterds, Ass Backwards, Freak Dance, Paper Heart and Semi-Pro. He made his most high-profile acting role in summer 2009, playing the male lead in the comedy film I Love You, Beth Cooper alongside Hayden Panettiere. Rust has written for television programs such as Human Giant and Moral Orel.

In November 2010, Rust appeared in the Comedy Central sketch comedy special This Show Will Get You High, created by and starring Matt Besser. He and Paul Reubens co-wrote the Pee-Wee Herman film Pee-wee's Big Holiday, which was released in 2016.

Rust appears as a frequent guest on the Comedy Bang! Bang! podcast, where he is best known for his "New No-Nos" segment. He has written for IFC's Comedy Bang! Bang! and also as a writer and story editor on the revived for Netflix fourth season of Arrested Development in 2013.

Rust starred in the Judd Apatow-produced Netflix series Love (2016–2018) with Gillian Jacobs. He co-created the show with his wife, Lesley Arfin.

Rust and the comedian Charlyne Yi formed the band The Glass Beef in 2006. They appeared together in a video for "Song Away" by Hockey. He is also the lead singer and bass guitar player in the comedy rock duo Don't Stop or We'll Die with fellow comedian Michael Cassady. The band had Harris Wittels on drums until his death.

Personal life
Rust married the comedy writer and author Lesley Arfin in October 2015. They have a daughter born in 2017.

Filmography

Film

Television

Discography
Albums (with Don't Stop or We'll Die)
 Gorgeous (2014)
 Dazzle Me (2018)
SONG-A-WEEK Volume One: Bloom of the Goji (2021)
Lives of Leisure, SONG-A-WEEK Volume II (2021)

EPs (with Don't Stop or We'll Die)
 The Ballad of Bird and Fox (2008)
 One of the Gang (2011)
Diamond Skies Over Western Dreams (2019)

References

External links

Paul Rust on Myspace

1981 births
Living people
Male actors from Iowa
American comedy musicians
American male film actors
American stand-up comedians
American male television actors
American television writers
American male television writers
University of Iowa alumni
American people of German descent
People from Le Mars, Iowa
Upright Citizens Brigade Theater performers
Screenwriters from Iowa
21st-century American comedians
American Roman Catholics
21st-century American screenwriters
21st-century American male writers